Antal Szendey (7 March 1915 – 6 May 1994) was a Hungarian rower who competed in the 1936 Summer Olympics and in the 1948 Summer Olympics.

He was born in Erzsébetfalva. In 1936 he was a crew member of the Hungarian boat which finished fifth in the eight event. At the 1947 European Rowing Championships in Lucerne, he won a gold medal in the coxed pair event. At the 1948 Summer Olympics in London, he won the bronze medal with the Hungarian boat in the coxed pair competition.

He died in Budapest in 1994.

References

1915 births
1994 deaths
Hungarian male rowers
Olympic rowers of Hungary
Rowers at the 1936 Summer Olympics
Rowers at the 1948 Summer Olympics
Olympic bronze medalists for Hungary
Olympic medalists in rowing
Medalists at the 1948 Summer Olympics
Rowers from Budapest
European Rowing Championships medalists